Wright's Stone Store is a historic store building located at Morristown in St. Lawrence County, New York.  It is a -story building with an exposed basement built of local limestone about 1821.  It is the earliest commercial structure in Morristown and served as a provisions store and community center until 1864.

It was listed on the National Register of Historic Places in 1982.

References

Commercial buildings on the National Register of Historic Places in New York (state)
Buildings and structures in St. Lawrence County, New York
National Register of Historic Places in St. Lawrence County, New York